Dero may refer to:
 Dero (annelid), a genus of annelids in the family Naididae
 Dero Goi (born 1970), German musician
 Dero, "detrimental robots" in the writing of Richard Sharpe Shaver
 Dero, one of the Nereids in Greek mythology
 Dero, a Romanian brand of detergents
 DeRo, the pairing of Deniz and Roman on Alles was zählt
 Dero!, a Japanese game show that formed the basis for Syfy's Exit
Dwayne De Rosario, Canadian soccer player, nicknamed DeRo
DeRo United Futbol Academy, Canadian soccer club founded by the above player

See also
 Derro (disambiguation)